George Damon Levy (born January 30, 1956) is a motorsports author, speaker, and historian and former editor of the enthusiast magazine Autoweek, and current President of the Motorsports Hall of Fame of America. He has contributed to various automotive publications and websites, including Autoweek, RACER, Car and Driver and Vintage Motorsport. He is best known for his 2016 book Can-am 50th Anniversary: Flat Out with North America’s Greatest Race Series, which earned a Gold Medal in the 2017 International Automotive Media Competition. He is a frequent collaborator with his longtime friend, the late, award-winning motorsports photographer Pete Biro. Their second book, F1 Mavericks: The Men and Machines that Revolutionized Formula 1 Racing, was published in July, 2019. More books together are in development.

Early life
George Levy was born and raised in Brookline, Massachusetts. He became a racing fan after reading Carroll Shelby and John Bentley's The Cobra Story (1965), Robert Daley's Cars At Speed (1961) and the Jim Clark autobiography, Jim Clark At The Wheel (1966), ghostwritten  by Clark's longtime friend Graham Gauld. Another book that would prove pivotal to his later career was Peter Manso's VROOOM!! Conversations with the Grand Prix Champions (1969). He learned to drive in a 1964½ Ford Mustang. He was one of the East Coast's earliest sport compact enthusiasts with a lowered and flared Datsun 510. Later, he owned the Brock Racing Enterprises (BRE)  “Screaming Yellow Zonker” 510. Levy moved to Detroit in 1980 before moving to the Daytona Beach, Florida area in 2019 to assume his duties at the Motorsports Hall of Fame of America.

Career

Journalism
Levy began his career in journalism at Autoweek in 1980. He was promoted to editor at 27, prompting popular columnist and friend Satch Carlson to refer to him as the “Boy Editor.”  Levy broke a number of major stories during his editorship, including Ford's plan to replace the Ford Mustang with a front-wheel-drive V6-powered car built by Japanese partner Mazda. The story was later picked up by other publications, including The New York Times. The resulting furor helped persuade Ford to continue the classic V8, rear-drive Mustang and rename the Mazda-based model, then only months from production, Probe.

“Autoweek published an April (1987) cover story titled ‘The New Mustang’ which laid out the blasphemy in full,” Road & Track wrote in 2013. “Fans pelted Ford with hundreds of thousands of letters against the proposed change to a car that had become an American icon.”

Levy is still active in motorsports journalism.

Authorship
In recent years, Levy has begun writing books as well, all of which have been collaborations with motorsports photographer Pete Biro. Levy's current and future works focus on ‘60s and ‘70s motorsports.

In 2016, Levy and Biro published their first collaboration, Can-am 50th Anniversary: Flat Out with North America’s Greatest Race Series. The book documents the 1966-1974 North American Canadian American Challenge Cup Series, renowned for its no-holds-barred ruleset. One of the foremost motorsports photographers of the era, Biro was able to supply photos from races he shot across the series’ nine seasons. Levy wrote the text, based on his own research plus interviews with over 75 of the original participants, from “gofers” to superstars. Motorsports icons interviewed for Can-Am 50th Anniversary include Jim Hall, Jackie Stewart, Mario Andretti, Dan Gurney, Stirling Moss, John Surtees and Parnelli Jones.

Of Can-Am 50th Anniversary, original series competitor and racing journalist and broadcaster Sam Posey wrote, “Your book is just fantastic. As far as I know, you've got the facts exactly right, which must have been the product of a lot of hard work and good thinking.” Car and Driver cited it as one of the “Sixteen Books Every Auto Enthusiast Should Read,” declaring it “The best account we have of the fierce, open-spec Can-Am series.” In 2017, Can-am 50th Anniversary was awarded a Gold Medal in the International Automotive Media Competition.

Levy and Biro's second book, F1 Mavericks: The Men and Machines that Revolutionized Formula 1 Racing, was released in July, 2019. It features a foreword by Mario Andretti and an afterword by the late Niki Lauda. On July 21, 2019 it became the #1 New Release in Automotive Pictorial Books on Amazon.

Levy is currently working on an authorized biography of Chaparral founder Jim Hall.

Motorsports Hall of Fame of America
Levy began serving on the board of directors of the Motorsports Hall of Fame of America in 2012 and was chosen by Founding President Ron Watson to be his successor starting in 2020. Due to Watson's untimely passing in late 2019, Levy assumed the position early. As President of the Hall of Fame, Levy oversees the induction process, which adds new members every March at a black-tie banquet, and manages its multidiscipline museum on the grounds of Daytona International Speedway in Daytona Beach, Florida. The museum attracts more than 100,000 visitors each year.

Personal life
Levy is based in Ormond Beach, Florida. He has two children, Casey and Zachary. Over the years he has competed in go-karts, showroom stock endurance races and the SCCA Pro Rally Championship.

List of Works
Can-am 50th Anniversary: Flat Out with North America’s Greatest Race Series. George Levy and Pete Biro, 2016.
F1 Mavericks: The Men and Machines that Revolutionized Formula 1 Racing. George Levy and Pete Biro, 2019.

Awards
2017 Gold Medal in the International Automotive Media Competition

References

1956 births
Living people